Célestin Djim Ndogo (born 14 May 1995) is a Belgian former professional footballer who played as a forward.

Club career

Porto
After progressing through the youth system at Standard Liège, Djim moved to Porto in the summer of 2014. During the 2014–15 season, he was sent out on loan to second division side Freamunde, where he scored 7 goals in 17 appearances. He was again loaned out by Porto the following season, this time to French club Metz. Djim made his debut for the Ligue 2 side on 23 October 2015, coming on as a late substitute in the 1–0 win away at Ajaccio.

Roda JC Kerkrade
In August 2016, after a two-year spell in Portugal and two loans, Djim permanently moved to Dutch side Roda Kerkrade. He suffered a serious knee injury in October 2017, prematurely ending his season.

Djim returned from injury before the 2018–19 season, but was demoted to the second team by head coach Robert Molenaar due to disciplinary issues in September 2018.

International career
Djim is a former youth international of Belgium, he played three times for the Belgium U-19 team between 2013 and 2014 but he has never represented the full team and like his brother Tony Djim, they are still eligible to play for the Central African Republic the country of their father.

Personal life
He is the son of the former Central African Republic international footballer Luciano Djim and brother of fellow footballer Tony Djim.

References

External links
 

1995 births
Living people
People from Visé
Belgian footballers
Belgian expatriate footballers
Belgian expatriate sportspeople in Portugal
Belgian expatriate sportspeople in France
Expatriate footballers in Portugal
Expatriate footballers in France
Belgian people of Central African Republic descent
Belgian sportspeople of African descent
Association football forwards
Liga Portugal 2 players
Ligue 2 players
FC Porto players
S.C. Freamunde players
FC Metz players
Eredivisie players
Eerste Divisie players
Roda JC Kerkrade players
Expatriate footballers in the Netherlands
Belgian expatriate sportspeople in the Netherlands
Footballers from Liège Province